Tatamma Kala ( Great-Grandmother's Dream) is a 1974 Telugu-language drama film, produced by Bhanumathi Ramakrishna directed by N. T. Rama Rao under his Ramakrishna Cine Studios banner. The film stars N. T. Rama Rao, Bhanumathi Ramakrishna and debutant Nandamuri Balakrishna  and has music composed by S. Rajeswara Rao.

Plot
The film begins in a village, lives a traditional, rich lady Ravamma (Bhanumathi Ramakrishna) whose husband Musalaiah (N. T. Rama Rao) becomes a wanderer. So, Ravamma safeguards their property and rears her grandson Ramaiah (again N. T. Rama Rao) who lost his parents in his childhood. Time passes, Ramaiah marries Seeta (Kanchana), and the couple is blessed with five children. But unfortunately, Ravamma loses her property due to land ceiling act, so, Ramayya decides to leave the city which Ravamma opposes, and stays back. Ramaiah reaches the city along with the family and joins as a clerk in an office. Years roll by, the children grew up with different mentalities, eldest one Govindu marries an intercaste girl Saru (Subha), and leaves for his in-law's house. The second son Hareram (Raja Babu) becomes a hippie, and the third Venkatesam (Nandamuri Harikrishna) goes into the trap of a girl, Mala (Vijayalalitha), and the daughter Rama (Roja Ramani) becomes a scapegoat to modern lifestyle. Finally, Ramiah lands up in jail for the crime committed by Hareram and his wife Seeta commits suicide. In that ruined family, the last one Balakrishna (Nandamuri Balakrishna) a good-natured boy who is left alone, reaches his great-grandmother. By that time, Ravamma is 97 years old, and seeing her great-grandson her heartfelt with joy. After that, Balakrishna learns that the village is under severe drought. So, he succeeds in bringing a green revolution using modern techniques for which he receives the Krishi Pandit award from the Govt of India and he presents the award to his great-grandmother. Ravamma feels proud that her great-grandson fulfilled the dream for which she is striving. At last,  Ramaiah is acquitted of catching Hareram and he returns to the village with the remaining family. Finally, Musalaiah also arrives and the movie ends on a happy note with the reunion of the entire family.

Cast

N. T. Rama Rao as Ramaiah and Musaliah
Bhanumathi Ramakrishna as Ravamma
Nandamuri Balakrishna as Balakrishna 
Nandamuri Harikrishna as Venkatesam
Ramana Reddy as John 
Raja Babu as Hare Ram 
Mada as Bhusaiah
P. J. Sarma as Venkaiah 
Chalapathi Rao 
Bhima Raju as Ratnam 
Balakrishna 
Jaya Bhaskar
Kanchana as Seeta
Roja Ramani as Rama 
Vijayalalitha as Mala
Subha as Saru

Soundtrack

Music composed by S. Rajeswara Rao. Music released on EMI Columbia Audio Company.

Awards
Nandi Award for Best Story Writer - N. T. Rama Rao (1974)

References

1974 films
1970s Telugu-language films
Indian drama films
Films scored by S. Rajeswara Rao
Films directed by N. T. Rama Rao
1974 drama films